An acequia or séquia is a community-operated watercourse used in Spain and former Spanish colonies in the Americas for irrigation. Particularly in Spain, the Andes, northern Mexico, and the modern-day American Southwest particularly northern New Mexico and southern Colorado, acequias are usually historically engineered canals that carry snow runoff or river water to distant fields. The hydrology of acequias benefit the ecological health, farming production, and maintaining groundwater levels. The acequia is an easily controllable way to resource way that is extremely resistant to ever changing climate. Examples of acequias in New Mexico have lengthy historical roots to Pueblo and Hispano communities, and they are incorporated into traditions including the matachines, life in the Rio Grande Bosque of the Albuquerque metropolitan area, and pilgrimages to El Santuario de Chimayo.

The term can also refer to the long central pool in a Moorish garden, such as the Generalife in the Alhambra in Southern Iberia.

Overview

The Spanish word  (and Catalan ) originates from the Arabic word al-sāqiyah ( لاساقیة). Traditionally the Spanish acequias have been associated with the Arab colonization of the Iberian peninsula; however the most likely hypothesis is that they improved on irrigation systems that already existed since Roman times, or even before. These ways of agricultural planning and colonization strategies come from the vast amount of  cultural influences contributing to Spanish technology and governance. Likely the most meaningful stemmed from the Arabs that ruled parts of Spain for as long as 8 centuries. Their ways of life influenced the Spanish and changed the way agriculture was done in Spain. It was adopted later by the Spanish and Portuguese (levadas on Madeira Island), utilized throughout their own colonies, although similar structures already existed in places such as Mendoza o San Juan, Argentina where acequias today run along both sides of all city streets but originally were dug all around by the indigenous Huarpes long before the arrival of the Spanish. The techniques introduced by the Muslims allowed for more agricultural diversity, with crops such as sugar cane and citrus fruits introduced. The system of the acequia has changed overtime to avoid incidents the resource from being overused or under-maintained.

In the United States, the oldest acequias were established more than 400 years ago; many continue to provide a primary source of water for farming and ranching ventures in areas of the United States once occupied by Spain or Mexico including the region of northern New Mexico and south central Colorado known as the Upper Rio Grande watershed or Rio Arriba. A recent agent-based model show the possible extinction of this type of agriculture depends on the future rates and weather patterns. This type of governance over Acequias is to date the oldest depiction of European resource management still alive in the United States today.

Acequias are gravity chutes, similar in concept to flumes. Some acequias are conveyed through pipes or aqueducts, of modern fabrication or decades or centuries old (see transvasement). In order for the system to function properly the channel needs to have a good gradient in order to keep the flow of water moving properly. The majority, however, are simple open ditches with dirt banks.  In many communities, the ditchbanks are important routes for non-motorized travel.

Researchers affiliated with the Rio Grande Bioregions Project at Colorado College initiated a pioneering collaborative, farmer-led, and interdisciplinary study of Colorado and New Mexico acequias in 1995-1999. Among the most significant findings of this study was that the acequia farms provide vital ecosystem and economic base services to the regions in which they are located. This pioneering research on acequia ecosystem services, led by environmental anthropologist Devon G. Peña, has more recently been confirmed in other studies {eg.

Known among water users simply as the Acequia, various legal entities embody the community associations, or acequia associations, that govern members' water usage, depending on local precedents and traditions.  An acequia organization often must include commissioners and a majordomo who administers usage of water from a ditch, regulating which holders of water rights can release water to their fields on which days. In New Mexico, by state statute, acequias as registered bodies must have three commissioners and a mayordomo. Irrigation and conservation districts typically have their own version of mayordomos, usually referred to as "ditch riders" by members of the districts.

In recent years, acequias in New Mexico and Colorado have successfully developed and implemented changes in state water laws to accommodate the unique norms, customs, and practices of the acequia systems. But these communal owners of the Acequias' in New Mexico are receiving hard economic pushes from land developers and current inflation that are pushing them to consider selling the valued Acequia. The customary law of the acequia is older than and at variance with the Doctrine of Prior Appropriation, and the statutes promulgating acequia water law represent a rare instance of water pluralism in the context of Western water law in the United States (see ). For example, the Doctrine of Prior Appropriation is based on the principle of "first in use, first in right," while acequia norms incorporate not just priority but principles of equity and fairness. This is evident in the fact that Prior Appropriation considers water to be a commodity owned by private individuals while acequia systems treat water as a community resource that irrigators have a shared right to use, manage, and protect. The concept of a shared responsibility natural resources reflects the beliefs stemming from the Spanish and Indegenous people who brought the Acequia to the U.S. The plethora of cultural behaviors and values that created acequia communities still exist in the United States. While Prior doctrines allow for water to be sold away from the basin of origin, the acequia system prohibits the transference of water from the watershed in which it is situated and thus considers water as an "asset-in-place". The Prior regime is based on a governance regime in which the members of a mutual ditch company will vote based on their proportional ownership of shares so that larger farmers have more votes. In contrast, the acequia system follows a "one farmer, one vote" system that has led researchers to consider this a form of "water democracy".

Acequia water law also requires that all persons with irrigation rights participate in the annual maintenance of the community ditch including the annual spring time ditch cleanup known as the limpieza y saca de acequia.

Gallery

See also

References

Citations

Works cited

Further reading
 Glick, Thomas F. The Old World Background of the Irrigation System of San Antonio, Texas. El Paso, Texas: Western Press, 1972. Spanish version, in Los cuadernos de Cauce 2000, No.15 (Madrid, 1988); also in Instituto de la Ingeniería de España, Obras hidráulicas prehispánicas y coloniales en América, I (Madrid, 1992), pp. 225–264.

External links 
 The Acequia Institute
 The New Mexico Acequia Association
 The New Mexico Acequia Commission
 Sangre de Cristo Acequia Association
 Taos Valley Acequia Association

Irrigation
Irrigation canals
Spanish words and phrases
Spain